A stealth edit occurs when an online resource is changed without any record of the change being preserved. The term has a negative connotation, as it is a technique which allows authors to attempt to retroactively change what is written.

A common scenario would be a reporter posting a diatribe against something, followed by a blogger posting that the reporter is too extreme, followed by the reporter stealth editing the original post to be less extreme. The result is that the blogger looks like the one who is too extreme, since the public can't tell that the original post has been changed.

The existence of stealth edits may often be detected by comparing the current contents of a web page against Google's cache of the same page. In some cases, stealth editing of online content can be manually identified by making use of a web archiving service.

Non-stealthy edit 
A variety of non-stealthy techniques exist when making corrections or updates:
 The title of the page can have an update notification prepended or appended to it, along with a brief description of what has changed.   
Deletions may remain but be crossed out, while additions are made in a different colour. 
 Publicly accessible change logs may be kept for every edit.

The common feature is that all these methods explicitly let the reader know that an edit has been made. A grey area exists when the edit is trivial (such as a typographic error). Some organizations flag all updates; others make a judgment call about what is considered a substantive update.

See also 
 Web archiving

Journalism terminology